Martin Miller may refer to:
Martin Miller (actor) (1899–1969), Czech actor
Martin Miller (cricketer, born 1940), English cricketer
Martin Miller (cricketer, born 1972), English cricketer
Martin Miller (footballer) (born 1997), Estonian footballer
Martin A. Miller, American historian of modern Russia
Martin M. Miller, member of the Mississippi House of Representatives

See also
Johann Martin Miller (1750–1814), German theologian and writer
Martin Millar (disambiguation)
Miller (name), a surname of English and Scottish origin
Martin Milner (1931–2015), American actor